Diana Patricia "Patty" Soto (born 10 February 1980) is a Peruvian volleyball player, and has captained the Peru women's national volleyball team.

She competed in the women's tournament at the 2000 Summer Olympics, 2010 FIVB Volleyball Women's World Championship, the 2011 Women's Pan-American Volleyball Cup, and the 2011 Montreux Volley Masters.

References

External links
 

1980 births
Living people
Peruvian women's volleyball players
Olympic volleyball players of Peru
Volleyball players at the 2000 Summer Olympics
Place of birth missing (living people)
Galatasaray S.K. (women's volleyball) players
21st-century Peruvian women